is a private women's college in Niiza, Saitama, Japan, established in 1996. The predecessor of the school was founded in 1922.

Alumni 
 Maki Sakai, an actress (who graduated from the attached junior college)
 Mayumi Ono, an actress

External links
 Official website 

Educational institutions established in 1922
Private universities and colleges in Japan
Universities and colleges in Saitama Prefecture
Women's universities and colleges in Japan
Niiza, Saitama
1922 establishments in Japan